Scopula defixaria is a moth of the family Geometridae. It is found in Venezuela and Colombia.

References

Moths described in 1861
defixaria
Moths of South America